Porzûs (also spelled Porzus) is a 1997 Italian historical war-drama film written and directed by Renzo Martinelli. For his performance in this film Lorenzo Crespi won the Globo d'oro for best breakthrough actor, while Gastone Moschin was nominated for Silver Ribbon for best supporting actor.

Plot 
One of the survivors of the Porzûs massacre, Storno, travels to Slovenia to visit Geko, who did not see since the end of the war. The two recall all the dramatic events that have seen them protagonists between late 1944 and February 1945.

Cast 
Lorenzo Crespi as  Carlo Tofani "Geko" (young)
Gastone Moschin as  Carlo Tofani "Geko" (old)
Lorenzo Flaherty as  Umberto Pautassi "Storno" (young)
Gabriele Ferzetti as  Umberto Pautassi "Storno" (old)
Giuseppe Cederna as  "Nullo"
Giulia Boschi as Ada Zambon
Bruno Bilotta as "Dinamo"
Massimo Bonetti as  "Gobbo"
Lino Capolicchio as  "Galvano"
Gianni Cavina as  "Spaccaossi"
Salvatore Calaciura as  "Africa"
Victor Cavallo as  "Scabbia"
Mariella Valentini as  Albina 
Pietro Ghislandi as  "Faccia-smorta"

References

External links

1990s war drama films
Italian war drama films
Films directed by Renzo Martinelli
Films about Italian resistance movement
Italian Campaign of World War II films
1997 drama films
1997 films
Italian World War II films
1990s Italian films